A Doll's House is a 1917 American silent drama film based on the eponymous 1879 play by Henrik Ibsen (original title: Et dukkehjem/ A Doll House). The film was written and directed by Joe De Grasse, and stars Lon Chaney, William Stowell and Dorothy Phillips. Film historian Jon C. Mirsalis stated that director De Grasse's wife Ida May Park wrote the screenplay, but most sources attribute both the writing and directing of the film to De Grasse himself. The film is today considered lost.

The film did not do well with the critics, who called it stagy and disappointing. Chaney's performance as the blackmailing Krogstad was singled out as brilliant, however. A still exists showing Chaney in the role of Krogstad. Two other silent film versions of the Ibsen play were produced, released in 1911 and 1918 respectively.

Plot
Nora Helmer (Dorothy Phillips) has years earlier committed a forgery in order to save the life of her authoritarian husband Torvald Helmer (William Stowell), a well-to-do bank manager. Her husband had become very ill, and the only thing that could save him was an operation in Italy. Unbeknownst to Torvald, Nora forged a check from her father's checkbook in order to get the money to send him there, aided and abetted by a crooked moneylender named Nils Krogstad (Lon Chaney) who worked as a clerk in her husband's bank.

Now she is being blackmailed by Krogstad, and lives in fear of her husband's finding out what she did, and of the shame such a revelation would bring to his career. Soon after, her husband catches Krogstad embezzling bank funds and fires him. Krogstad threatens to expose Nora if she does not help him to get his job back, but Nora persuades her husband to give Korgstad's job to a needy widow named Christina Linde instead.

In retaliation, the moneylender tells Nora's husband everything. Even though Nora committed the forgery to save her husband from death, he still becomes enraged and cannot find it in himself to forgive her. He lectures her mercilessly until, in the end, Nora winds up leaving him in hopes of finding a better life elsewhere.

Cast
 Dorothy Phillips as Nora Helmer
 William Stowell as Torvald Helmer
 Lon Chaney as Nils Krogstad
 Sydney Deane as Dr. Rank
 Helen Wright as Anna
 Myriam Shelby as Christina Linden

Reception
"As a means of popular entertainment it is doubtful that the screen version of A DOLL'S HOUSE...will become much of a success. The absence of the theatrical in the Ibsen method and the difficulty of conveying the fine shades of meaning in the dialogue without the aid of speech render the task of the actors in the cast doubly hard...The Helmer of William Stowell, the Krogstad of Lon Chaney, the Dr. Rank of Sydney Deane, the Christina of Miriam Shelby and the Anna of Helen Wright are all worthy of praise." --- Moving Picture World

"Bluebird's production of Henrik Ibsen's play A Doll's House turns out to be a dramatically fine piece of work in every respect...(It) is more likely to win new audiences than to swell the old ones." --- Motion Picture News

References

External links
 
 

1917 films
1917 drama films
Silent American drama films
American silent feature films
American black-and-white films
Films based on A Doll's House
Films directed by Joseph De Grasse
Universal Pictures films
1910s American films